Manoranjan Kalia is a leader of Bharatiya Janata Party legislature party in Punjab in India and was cabinet minister in Akali Dal- BJP government. His residence is at Jalandhar City. He contested for the seat of MLA from Jalandhar Central. Manoranjan Kalia is basically a lawyer, later on he joined politics. In the previous SAD-BJP Government in Punjab, Manoranjan Kalia had the status of Cabinet Minister and was representing Bhartiya Janta Party in the Government.

References

External links

People from Punjab, India
People from Jalandhar
State cabinet ministers of Punjab, India
Living people
Bharatiya Janata Party politicians from Punjab
Members of the Punjab Legislative Assembly
Punjab, India MLAs 2012–2017
1958 births